Aozihdi is a station on the Red line of Kaohsiung MRT at the edge of Zuoying District and Gushan District, Kaohsiung, Taiwan. The name comes from lap-a-té (漯仔底), which is an old name of this area.

History
The station was opened on 9 March 2008.

Station overview

The station is a two-level, underground station with an island platform and four exits. It is 217 meters long and is located at the intersection of Bo-ai 1st Rd. and Dashun Rd.

Around the station
 Circular light rail Heart of Love River light rail station
 Longhua Elementary School
 The Heart of the Love River
 "Agriculture 16" secondary city center
 Shopping District along Migcheng Road

References

External links
KRTC Aozihdi Station

2008 establishments in Taiwan
Gushan District
Kaohsiung Metro Red line stations
Railway stations opened in 2008